Yamba is a Grassfields language of the Northwest region of southern Cameroon, with a small number of speakers in Eastern Nigeria. Mbem village has the largest population of Yamba speakers in the region.

References

Languages of Cameroon
Nkambe languages